Alexeyevskoye is a rural locality (a village) in Inzersky Selsoviet, Arkhangelsky District, Bashkortostan, Russia. The population was 20 as of 2010. There is 1 street.

Geography 
Alexeyevskoye is located 18 km north of Arkhangelskoye (the district's administrative centre) by road. Valentinovka is the nearest rural locality.

References 

Rural localities in Arkhangelsky District